Fred Ewanuick (/əˈwαnɪk/; born June 23, 1971) is a Canadian actor known for his roles in the television series Corner Gas as Hank Yarbo and as the title character in the CTV sitcom Dan for Mayor. He was also a regular in a CTV anthology series, Robson Arms. He starred in Nickelodeon's summer 2013 TV movie Swindle.

He is also well known for his several award wins for the 2003 lead role in the comedy The Delicate Art of Parking, and reprised his role as Richard Henry "Hank" Yarbo in Corner Gas: The Movie, winning him a Gemini Award, and much praise. He also had roles in popular films including The Santa Clause 2, Just Friends, Young Triffie, and a romantic comedy with several other Corner Gas stars in Love and Other Dilemmas, and the disaster film Absolute Zero.

Early life
Ewanuick was born and raised in Port Moody, British Columbia, Canada. He is of Ukrainian and Italian descent. His first job was a paper route, but he was fired for disposing of the newspapers in dumpsters as a "time saver". He later worked in a bingo hall until his high school graduation from Port Moody Secondary School, in 1989.

Career
At college he enrolled in English, Women’s Studies and Theatre courses, the only courses available, subsequently failing all three. After auditioning and being accepted into the two-year theater intensive program, he was asked to leave one year into the program. He subsequently trained for four years with acting coach Shea Hampton, with whom he continues to study in Vancouver, British Columbia, where he also resides.

He made his television debut on The New Addams Family in 1998 as a "spinning gnome".
Following guest appearances on both Canadian and American television series such as Cold Squad, Monk, Dark Angel, The Twilight Zone, Da Vinci's Inquest and Tru Calling, Ewanuick became a regular on the CTV series Corner Gas, as Hank Yarbo. The series was a hit, making Ewanuick a familiar face in Canadian households. In 2005, he began starring simultaneously in the CTV comedy-drama series Robson Arms with Corner Gas co-star Gabrielle Miller.

Ewanuick has appeared in numerous films, including The Delicate Art of Parking (2003), which premiered at the Montreal World Film Festival. The film won the Best Canadian Feature prize. Later, Ewanuick won a Best Actor award at Spain's Peñiscola Comedy Film Festival for the same film. In the comedy Young Triffie (2007), Ewanuick stars as a young Newfoundland Ranger investigating a crime. Originally, Ewanuick was not cast for the part. However, the casting staff could not agree on whom to choose for the part. Ewanuick was called to audition for the part after being suggested because of his work on Corner Gas.

In late 2008, CTV commissioned a half-hour sitcom pilot for a new comedy titled Dan for Mayor, starring Ewanuick as Dan. Dan For Mayor was written by Mark Farrell, Paul Mather, and Kevin White. Ewanuick portrayed Dan, a 30-something bartender who lives and works in the fictional city of Wessex, Ontario. The series ended in 2011.

In 2013, he played Paul Swindell in Swindle.

In 2014, Ewanuick reprised his role as Hank Yarbo in Corner Gas: The Movie.

In 2016, Ewanuick was the championship goalie in the Burnaby 8 Rinks Weekend Hockey League Division C1A playoffs.

Filmography

Television works

Nominations

References

External links
 
 "Fred Ewanuick" Official Website

1971 births
Living people
Canadian male film actors
Canadian male television actors
Canadian male voice actors
Canadian people of Ukrainian descent
Canadian people of Italian descent
People from Port Moody
Male actors from British Columbia